Good Hunting may refer to:

 Good Hunting, a play written by Nathanael West, in collaboration with Joseph Schrank
 Earlier title of short story "Red Dog" by Rudyard Kipling (also frequently used phrase in Kipling's The Jungle Book and The Second Jungle Book)